Daniel Branda (born 20 February 1976) is a Czech former professional ice hockey forward who played for HC Slavia Praha of the Czech Extraliga.

References

External links

Living people
HC Slavia Praha players
1976 births
Czech ice hockey forwards
Piráti Chomutov players
HC Sparta Praha players
SG Cortina players
Skellefteå AIK players
HC Sibir Novosibirsk players
Rytíři Kladno players
HC Litvínov players
Sportspeople from Chomutov
Czech expatriate ice hockey players in Sweden
Czech expatriate ice hockey players in Russia
Czech expatriate sportspeople in Italy
Expatriate ice hockey players in Italy